Dr. Narayan Singh Manaklao is a noted social worker of India and was member of the Rajya Sabha, by nomination during August 2003 to August 2009.
He is also a recipient of the Padma Bhushan award. He was born in Jodhpur district of Rajasthan in 1942.

He was awarded the Padma Bhushan in 1991 by the Government of India in recognition of dedicated services rendered in helping to reduce the anti-social consumption of opium by organizing systematic and scientific de-addiction programmes, which have benefited thousands of rural and urban men, women and children drawn from all strata of society since 1980. He established Sucheta Kriplani Shiksha Niketan, a unique residential Senior Secondary School to impart free and quality education to the physically disabled children in 1991.

He had earlier received Padma Shri in 1986.

External links 
 Manaklao at the Parliament of India website

References

Living people
1942 births
Social workers from Rajasthan
Rajasthani people
Recipients of the Padma Shri in social work
Recipients of the Padma Bhushan in social work
Bharatiya Janata Party politicians from Rajasthan
Nominated members of the Rajya Sabha
People from Jodhpur district
20th-century Indian politicians
Social workers